Luis Suárez Miramontes (born 2 May 1935) is a Spanish former professional footballer and manager. He played as a midfielder for Deportivo de La Coruña, España Industrial, FC Barcelona, Inter Milan, Sampdoria and the Spain national team. Suárez is regarded as one of the greatest Spanish football players of all time. He was noted for his elegant, fluid, graceful style of play. 

Nicknamed El Arquitecto – The Architect – Suárez was noted for his perceptive passing and explosive shot, and in 1960, he became the first and only male Spanish-born player to win the Ballon d'Or. In 1964, he helped Spain win the European Championship. Suárez originally achieved prominence as a creative inside forward, or attacking midfielder in modern terms, for the great Barcelona team of the 1950s before he joined Inter Milan where he reached his prime as deep-lying playmaker for the legendary Grande Inter team of the 1960s. He played a pivotal role in the success of Herrera's Inter Milan side, and was one of the primary creative forces in the squad, due to his skill on the ball, vision, and passing range. He retired as a player in 1973, after three seasons at Sampdoria.

Suárez subsequently began a career as a coach and has managed Inter Milan on three occasions, the last two on a caretaker basis. Suárez has also coached both Spain U21s and the senior Spain team. He was in charge of the latter for 27 games and led them to the second round of the 1990 World Cup. He has also coached several Italian and Spanish club sides. He is currently a scout for Inter Milan.

Club career

Early career
Luis Suárez Miramontes was born on 2 May 1935, in A Coruña, Galicia. He lived on Avenida de Hércules in the working-class neighborhood of Monte Alto where he was known by the diminutive Luisito.

He began his career with local side Deportivo de La Coruña in 1949 and worked his way through the junior sides before making his La Liga debut with Deportivo on 6 December 1953 in a 6–1 defeat to FC Barcelona. Among his teammates at Deportivo were Pahiño and Arsenio Iglesias. He played 17 games and scored 3 goals for Deportivo during the remaining season. In 1954, he was transferred to FC Barcelona but spent most of the 1954–55 season playing for their reserve side, España Industrial, in the second division.

FC Barcelona
Between 1955 and 1961 Suárez was a regular in a FC Barcelona team that also included the Hungarian trio Ladislao Kubala, Zoltán Czibor and Sándor Kocsis, alongside Ramallets and Evaristo. With Helenio Herrera as coach, the club and Suárez won a domestic league–cup double in 1959 and a league–Fairs Cup double the subsequent year. As a result, Suárez was voted Ballon d'Or in 1960, beating Real Madrid's Ferenc Puskás. One of his last games for the club was the final of the European Cup in 1961 which they lost 3–2 to Benfica.

Inter Milan 

In 1961, Suárez became the world's most expensive footballer and the first £100,000 transfer when FC Barcelona sold him to Inter Milan for 250 million Italian lire (£142,000). The move saw him follow his mentor Helenio Herrera. Along with Juan Santisteban, he became the first Spanish player in the Serie A.

Suárez was a regular in Herrera's Grande Inter team that won three Serie A titles, two consecutive European Cups and two Intercontinental Cups. Between 1961 and 1970 he made 328 appearances for Inter and scored 55 goals. On 10 March 1963, he scored three times in a 6–0 win over Genoa; this was the only hat-trick by a Spaniard in Serie A until Suso's for Genoa in 2016, to whom Suárez sent his congratulations.

International career
Suárez also played 32 games for Spain and scored fourteen goals. He made his debut on 30 January 1957 in a 5–1 victory over the Netherlands and represented Spain at both the 1962 and 1966 FIFA World Cups. However his greatest achievement with Spain came in 1964 when, together with Josep Maria Fusté, Amancio Amaro, José Ángel Iribar and Chus Pereda, he helped them win the European Championship. He played his final game for Spain in 1972.

Career statistics

International

International goals

Honours

Club

FC Barcelona
La Liga: 1958–59, 1959–60
Copa del Generalísimo: 1957, 1958–59
Inter-Cities Fairs Cup: 1955–58, 1958–60

Inter Milan
Serie A: 1962–63, 1964–65, 1965–66
European Cup: 1963–64, 1964–65
Intercontinental Cup: 1964, 1965

International
Spain
 European Nations' Cup: 1964

Individual
Ballon d'Or: 1960
 Silver Ball: 1961, 1964
 Bronze Ball: 1965
Eric Batty's World XI: 1963, 1964, 1965
UEFA European Championship Team of the Tournament: 1964
Golden Foot: 2008, as football legend
Marca Leyenda: 2016
Orders
   Gold Medal of the Royal Order of Sporting Merit: 2001

References

External links

 
 
 
 
  International Stats

1935 births
Living people
Spanish footballers
Footballers from A Coruña
Association football midfielders
Deportivo de La Coruña players
CD Condal players
FC Barcelona players
Inter Milan players
U.C. Sampdoria players
La Liga players
Serie A players
UEFA Champions League winning players
Ballon d'Or winners
Spain international footballers
Catalonia international guest footballers
1962 FIFA World Cup players
1964 European Nations' Cup players
1966 FIFA World Cup players
UEFA European Championship-winning players
Spanish expatriate footballers
Spanish expatriate sportspeople in Italy
Expatriate footballers in Italy
Spanish football managers
Inter Milan managers
U.C. Sampdoria managers
S.P.A.L. managers
Como 1907 managers
Cagliari Calcio managers
Deportivo de La Coruña managers
Spain national under-21 football team managers
Spain national football team managers
Albacete Balompié managers
Serie A managers
La Liga managers
1990 FIFA World Cup managers
Spanish expatriate football managers
Expatriate football managers in Italy